Jonathan Kemp (born 18 March 1981 in Wolverhampton) is a professional squash player who represented England. He reached a career-high world ranking of World No. 20 in July 2010.

References

External links 
 
 

English male squash players
Living people
1981 births
Sportspeople from Wolverhampton